is a greatest hits album by Japanese pop band Dreams Come True. It was released on July 7, 2016. It was number-one on the Oricon weekly Albums Chart on its release, with 108,797 copies sold. It was the third best-selling album in Japan in July 2016, with 162,968 copies sold. It was also number-one on the Billboard Japan Top Album Sales chart and number-two on the Billboard Japan Hot Albums chart.

Track listing

Disc 1

Disc 2

Disc 3

Charts

References

2016 greatest hits albums
Universal Music Japan albums
Dreams Come True (band) albums